Naogaon Government College is a public educational institution based in Naogaon District, Bangladesh. It was established in 1962 with 300 students, and currently serves about 16,000. It is situated at the north-east part of Naogaon and is authorized by the National University.

Its  campus has two three-story buildings, one of which is used for administrative and academic purpose that also includes a library enriched with more than 25,000 books and another building is for science faculty.

Naogaon Government College was nationalized in 1980.

History

Naogaon Government College, also known as Naogaon University College, was first planned in 1959. In that time the Administrator Mr. Abdul Baten established the foundation at the north-east part of Naogaon. It was workable at the time of Abdur Rob Chawdhory. In 1962 with the help of some local people of Naogaon, a degree college was established with 3 years graduation courses. But the student could not accept it. As a result, it was neglected and after some days the HSC Course was also started. In 1980, Naogaon Government College was nationalized. Now it is Naogaon Government College. In 1996, the college had started honors in 10 subjects and masters in 9 subjects. Its area is almost 11 acre.

Academic departments
The college has 16 departments:

Facilities

Residential student halls
There are 2 residential Hall for male students And 2 for female students.

Other facilities
Free WiFi

Notable alumni
 Zillur Rahman, former president of Bangladesh

See also

 Chalkmuli High School
 Chalkmomin Government Primary School
 Naogaon Zilla School
 Nazipur Government College

References

Universities and colleges in Naogaon District
Colleges in Naogaon District
Educational institutions established in 1962
1962 establishments in East Pakistan